Voldemar is largely an Estonian masculine given name. People with the name Voldemar include:
Voldemar Aussem (1879–1936), Soviet nobleman, communist official and diplomat
Voldemar Hammer (1894–1982), Estonian politician
Voldemar Jaanus (1905–1977), Estonian politician
Johann Voldemar Jannsen (1819–1890), Estonian journalist and poet
Voldemar Kuslap (born 1937), Estonian opera and operetta singer and actor
Voldemar Lender (1876–1939), Estonian engineer and the first Estonian mayor of Tallinn
Voldemar Lestienne (1931–1990), French writer and journalist
Voldemar Mägi (1914–1954), Estonian wrestler
Voldemar Mellik (1887–1949), Estonian sculptor
Voldemar Noormägi (1895–1967), Estonian lightweight weightlifter
Voldemar Oinonen (1891–1963), Finnish military commander
Voldemar Panso (1920–1977), Estonian stage director, actor and theatrical teacher
Voldemar Päts (1878–1958), Estonian artist, art teacher and politician
Voldemar Peterson (1908–1976), Estonian footballer
Voldemar Puhk (1897–1937), Estonian diplomat, businessman, economist and politician
Voldemar Rõks (1901–1941), Estonian footballer
Voldemar Roolaan (1914–1991), Estonian wrestler
Voldemar Vaga (1899–1999), Estonian art and architecture historian
Voldemar Väli (1903–1997), Estonian Greco-Roman wrestler
Voldemar Vöölmann (1887–1937), Estonian Communist politician and former mayor of Tallinn

References

Estonian masculine given names